Paperhouse may refer to:

 Paperhouse (film), a 1988 British film
 Paperhouse Records, a British independent record label
 "Paperhouse", a song by Can from the 1971 album Tago Mago
 The Paper House, a historic house museum largely made out of newspaper